Macrocoma obscuripes is a species of leaf beetle endemic to the Canary Islands. It was first described by Thomas Vernon Wollaston in 1862 as a species of Pseudocolaspis. It is found on Gran Canaria.

References

obscuripes
Endemic beetles of the Canary Islands
Beetles described in 1862
Taxa named by Thomas Vernon Wollaston